Acacia pellita is a shrub or tree belonging to the genus Acacia and the subgenus Juliflorae that is endemic to parts of tropical northern Australia.

Description
It has slightly angular ribbed branchlets that are covered by a dense matting of woolly hairs. Like most species of Acacia it has phyllodes rather than true leaves. The papery to slightly coriaceous phyllodes have two to four prominent main nerves that are concurrent with each other. It blooms from May to August producing yellow flowers.

Distribution
It is native to a large area in the Northern Territory and the Kimberley region of Western Australia where the plant will grow in sandy or loamy soils and prefers damp conditions. It is often situated along creek banks growing in sandy soils as a part of Eucalyptus woodland communities where it is often found in shady locations on or around sandstone or laterite.

See also
List of Acacia species

References

pellita
Acacias of Western Australia
Flora of the Northern Territory
Plants described in 1927